Stephen Creyke (13 October 1796 – 11 December 1883) was an English Anglican priest. He was Archdeacon of York from 1845 to 1866.

Creyke was born in Stonehouse, Plymouth, England, and was educated at Corpus Christi College, Oxford. He held livings at Beeford and Bolton Percy. He died in Bolton Percy, Yorkshire, England.

Notes

Archdeacons of York
Alumni of Corpus Christi College, Oxford
1796 births
1883 deaths
19th-century English Anglican priests